The seventh and final season of the American television spy drama Burn Notice aired from June 6, 2013 to September 12, 2013, on the cable television channel USA Network. The 13-episode season was ordered by USA Network on November 7, 2012. In May 2013, the network announced that this season will be the show's last. Production on the series wrapped on July 31, 2013.

Cast

Jack Coleman plays Andrew Strong, a CIA officer who pushes Michael to do whatever it takes to complete a mission that has consumed Strong for eight years. Stephen Martines plays Carlos Cruz, a bounty hunter who is Fiona's new boyfriend. Nick Tarabay plays Dexter Gamble, a freelance operative, in two episodes. Adrian Pasdar plays Randall Burke, a former special ops soldier who is suspected of running a freelance terrorist ring. Ricardo Antonio Chavira guest stars in two episodes as international terrorist Rafael Serrano. Charles Mesure makes a guest appearance as Jack Frakes, the head of a criminal hacking syndicate. Alona Tal plays Sonya, the woman Burke calls "the key to everything", while John Pyper-Ferguson plays her boss, James Kendrick.

Tim Matheson reprises his role as "Dead Larry" Sizemore in one of Michael's hallucinations. Garret Dillahunt returns as Simon Escher in the season's eleventh episode.

Episodes

References

External links

 
 

2013 American television seasons